The first inauguration of Elpidio Quirino as the sixth President of the Philippines occurred on April 17, 1948, under extraordinary circumstances. The inauguration marked the commencement of the first term (which lasted a year eight months and thirteen days) of Elpidio Quirino as President, following the death of President Manuel Roxas.

1948 in the Philippines
Presidency of Elpidio Quirino
Quirino, Elpidio
Malacañang Palace